The 1927 Major League Baseball season began in April and ended with the World Series in October. The New York Yankees, whose lineup featured Babe Ruth and Lou Gehrig, dominated the American League with 110 wins. The Yankees swept the Pittsburgh Pirates in the World Series. No no-hitters were thrown during the season.

This was the sixth of eight seasons that "League Awards", a precursor to the Major League Baseball Most Valuable Player Award (introduced in 1931), were issued.

Standings

American League

National League

Postseason

Bracket

Award winners

League leaders

Managers

American League

National League

Home Field Attendance

Notable events
On July 18, the Philadelphia Phillies used four pitchers as pinch hitters and pinch runners against the Pittsburgh Pirates. Jack Scott, Clarence Mitchell and Les Sweetland hit, while Tony Kaufmann ran for Scott.

On September 30, in a game against the Washington Senators, New York Yankee outfielder Babe Ruth smashed his 60th home run of the year.

References

External links
1927 Major League Baseball season schedule at Baseball Reference

 
Major League Baseball seasons